Liam Bretherton (born 20 June 1979) is a former Ireland international rugby league footballer who played for the Wigan Warriors, Leigh Centurions, Warrington Wolves, Blackpool Panthers and Workington Town.

He played at representative level for Ireland at the 2000 Rugby League World Cup.

Bretherton started his professional career at Warrington Wolves, making two appearances for the club during the 1997 season. After spending time on loan at Whitehaven in 1998, he signed for Wigan Warriors after a successful trial.

Bretherton was advised to retire from rugby league at the age of 23 after suffering a dislocated wrist. After spending time in coaching roles with Wigan and Leigh, he later decided to resume his playing career with Blackpool Panthers.

In 2011, he was appointed to the coaching staff at Huddersfield Giants as a strength and conditioning coach.

References

External links
(archived by web.archive.org) The Teams: Ireland
Statistics at wigan.rlfans.com

1979 births
Living people
Blackpool Panthers players
English people of Irish descent
English rugby league players
Ireland national rugby league team players
Leigh Leopards players
Place of birth missing (living people)
Rugby league wingers
Warrington Wolves players
Whitehaven R.L.F.C. players
Wigan Warriors players
Workington Town players